The 2009 Brno Superbike World Championship round was the tenth round of the 2009 Superbike World Championship season. It took place on the weekend of July 24-26, 2009 at the Masaryk Circuit located in Brno. Ben Spies, Michel Fabrizio and Max Biaggi were the three dominant riders on pace all weekend - Fabrizio took Spies out in a collision in race one (handing Aprilia their first win since returning to WSBK at the start of the season), before all three were on the race two podium. Checa and Rea gave Ten Kate their first ever double WSBK podium finish in race one. Championship leader Noriyuki Haga was still not 100% fit following his huge crash at Mugello in the previous round, but Spies' non-finish in race one reduced the damage to his championship. Troy Corser made flying starts to lead both races on the BMW, while his teammate Rubén Xaus suffered a broken leg in a big crash on lap one of race one.

Results

Superbike race 1

Superbike race 2

Supersport race

References
 Superbike Race 1 (Archived 2009-07-28)
 Superbike Race 2
 Supersport Race

External links
 The official website of the Superbike World Championship

Brno Round
Brno Superbike